Agustín Fernández (born 10 March 1958) is a Bolivian composer who has lived and worked in the United Kingdom since 1984. In March 2020 Fernández was found guilty of 13 sexual offences, including rape and sexual assault, for which he was sentenced to 23 years in custody. He was absent from the ruling.

Career
In Bolivia Fernández began musical life as a child, singing and playing the charango in folk clubs. Still a teenager he worked as a violinist and then viola player with the National Symphony Orchestra and taught harmony at the National Conservatoire, while studying composition with Alberto Villalpando. He later studied in Japan with Takashi Iida and with Akira Ifukube, while working part-time at the Bolivian Embassy and as a language instructor.

In the United Kingdom, after obtaining a PhD at City University Fernández was composer-in-residence at Queen's University Belfast since 1990 until 1994. Following a year's lectureship at Dartington Colleague of Arts, he was a composition lecturer at Newcastle University from 1996 until 2007 and Professor of Composition there from 2007 until his resignation in 2019.

Fernández's work has been performed and acclaimed internationally, featuring at festivals such as Focus!, Summergarden (New York), ISEA (Montreal), International New Music Week (Bucharest), Latin American Music Festival (Caracas), Huddersfield Contemporary Music Festival, London International Opera Festival and many others. Some of his folk arrangements have been singled out for their wide appeal.

Misa de Corpus Christi, first premièred in La Paz under the twenty year-old composer's direction in 1978, was later destroyed and then  recomposed in 2009 for performances in 2010 and 2011.

While his first electroacoustic work, the opera Teoponte, had mixed reviews on its London première (1988), the also electroacoustic Wounded Angel (1989) was generally well received internationally and was released twice on commercial recordings. His second opera, The Wheel (1993) was generally considered a success on its London première by Royal Opera House's now extinct Covent Garden. Also well received were two subsequent works for baritone, choir and orchestra: Approaching Melmoth (2000) and Notes from Underground (2016). On the New York première of his String Quartet No. 2 Sin tiempo (a Koussevitzky commission), one reviewer commented “…this city needs a Fernández festival”.

Fernández has been a regular visitor to Romania for speaking engagements and performances of his work at the Sigismund Toduță International Festival in Cluj-Napoca and at the SIMN Festival in Bucharest. In 2018 the Music Academy Gheorghe Dima (Cluj-Napoca) awarded him an honorary doctorate.

In his native country he has been awarded prizes such as Golden Charango (1971), Honour to Merit (1975), National Composition Prize Sesquicentennial of the Republic (1975) and Meritorious Citizenship of Cochabamba (2016).

Fernández has vehemently denied the accusations made against him and considers himself the target of a miscarriage of justice. He has also refuted reports in the British tabloid press of his having fled after being sentenced, stressing that he was absent from the country at the time of his trial.

References

External links
Joel Sachs. 2013. "Fernández, Agustín." Grove Music Online. Oxford Music Online. Oxford University Press.
The Living Composers Project
 Interview with Dr Agustín Fernández

Bolivian composers
Bolivian male musicians
British composers
Male composers
Living people
1958 births
NoBusiness Records artists